Operation C.I.A. is a 1965 black-and-white spy film directed by Christian Nyby and starring Burt Reynolds and John Hoyt.

Plot
When CIA Agent Stacey (Marsh Thomson) learns of a plan to assassinate the American ambassador to Vietnam but is killed by a bomb before he can inform the C.I.A. of the details, Secret Agent Mark Andrews (Burt Reynolds) is sent to Saigon to take his place as a university professor as a cover while he attempts to prevent the assassination of the American ambassador that is expected to occur sometime within the next five days.

Cast
 Burt Reynolds as CIA Agent Mark Andrews
 John Hoyt as Wells
 Kieu Chinh as Kim-Chinh
 Danielle Aubry as Denise
 Cyril Collick as Withers
 William Catching as Frank Decker
 Vic Diaz as Professor Yen
 Marsh Thomson as CIA Agent Stacey

Production
The film was originally titled Last Message from Saigon with an announcement made in 1964 it would be filmed in Saigon, Hong Kong and Bangkok. Allied Artists filmed A Yank in Viet-Nam on actual South Vietnamese locations, but the security situation had deteriorated to such an extent that the safety of the filmmakers could not be guaranteed.

Filming began in Bangkok in January 1965.

Said Reynolds:

Producer Peer Oppenheimer later signed Reynolds to appear with Diane Cilento in Deadly Contest, to be filmed in Germany, but the project did not happen.

In popular culture
Operation C.I.A. was referenced in the Archer episode "The Man from Jupiter", in which Reynolds makes a guest appearance as himself. Sterling Archer claims the film inspired him to become a secret agent, to which Reynolds replies "that film was god-awful."

See also
List of American films of 1965

References

External links

1965 films
1960s thriller drama films
1960s spy thriller films
Allied Artists films
American black-and-white films
American spy thriller films
American thriller drama films
Cold War spy films
Films directed by Christian Nyby
Films set in Saigon
Films shot in Thailand
Vietnam War films
1965 drama films
1960s English-language films
1960s American films